Bierzów refers to the following places in Poland:

 Bierzów, Greater Poland Voivodeship
 Bierzów, Opole Voivodeship